Väinö Markkanen (9 May 1929 – 10 June 2022) was a Finnish sports shooter and Olympic champion. He won the gold medal in the 50 metre pistol at the 1964 Summer Olympics in Tokyo.

Markkanen died of a heart attack on 10 June 2022, at the age of 93.

References

External links
 

1929 births
2022 deaths
Finnish male sport shooters
Shooters at the 1964 Summer Olympics
Olympic shooters of Finland
Olympic gold medalists for Finland
Olympic medalists in shooting
Medalists at the 1964 Summer Olympics
People from Paltamo
Sportspeople from Kainuu